Eurasmus was a website founded in 2014 that offered accommodation, internships and unique city guides online. It offered a system in which exchange students could view many vacancies and easily apply to them or find accommodation and book it online using a secure payment system, what allows the students to have a room or apartment before they arrive in their Erasmus destination. Since February 2018 the website is no longer in use, and the domain is occupied by a porn site.

History 
Eurasmus was founded in 2014 and is based in Seville, Spain. The company was given funding by the European Regional Development Fund scheme, allowing it to expand across Europe. The company had the aim to integrate by the end of 2015 a free internship portal for students looking to find internships, work placements and even jobs across Europe.

Operational 

Eurasmus was a free to use platform for both landlords and users such as universities and students. Both sides had to create an account filling in the necessary information. Once a booking was successfully made, the landlord received the first month of rent minus a small fee, which was calculated based upon the number of months the tenant would be staying.

The company offered these services:

Accommodation 

Students could find a room in most European cities and Erasmus destinations by the integrated system.

Internships/Student jobs 
Users could look through the list Internships and Student jobs all over Europe in any field and apply for them using the platform, which also allowed the users to create their CV online or apply by a LinkedIn profile.

Student guides 

Student reviews created from students to students.

Secure Payment 
In order to ensure that there were no scams, the money was held until 24 hours after the tenant had arrived at their destination. If a complaint was made, then a team was assigned to investigate the complaint.

References

Spanish travel websites
Defunct websites
Internet properties established in 2014
Internet properties disestablished in 2018
2014 establishments in Spain
2018 disestablishments in Spain